The 2015–16 Campeonato de Portugal (also known as Campeonato de Portugal Prio, for sponsorship reasons) was the third season of Portuguese football's renovated third-tier league, since the merging of the Segunda Divisão and Terceira Divisão in 2013, and the first season under the current Campeonato de Portugal title. A total of 80 teams competed in this division, which began on 23 August 2015 and ended on 10 June 2016.

Format
The competition format consisted of two stages. In the first stage, the 80 clubs were divided in eight series of 10 teams, according to geographic criteria. The only exceptions were teams from Madeira, which were placed in the first series, and teams from the Azores, which were distributed through the latter series. In each series, teams played against each other in a home-and-away double round-robin system.

In the second stage, the two best-placed teams from each first-stage series were divided in two groups of eight teams, again according to geographic proximity, with home-and-away matches. The two group winners, plus the winner of a two-legged play-off between the two group runners-up, secured promotion to the LigaPro. To determine the overall division champion, the group winners contested a one-off grand final on neutral ground.

The remaining eight clubs from each first-stage series were divided in eight groups of eight teams, with home-and-away matches. The bottom-two teams from each group were relegated to the Districts Championships. The sixth-placed teams were paired into four two-legged play-out ties, with the four winners being paired into two further two-legged play-out ties. All six play-out losers were also relegated.

Teams
Relegated from the 2014–15 Segunda Liga:
 Marítimo B
 Trofense

From the 2014–15 Campeonato Nacional de Seniores:

 Fafe
 Mirandela
 Vilaverdense
 Bragança
 Vianense
 Pedras Salgadas
 Limianos
 Vizela
 Felgueiras 1932
 AD Oliveirense
 Amarante
 Vila Real
 Tirsense
 Sousense
 Salgueiros  
 Gondomar
 Coimbrões
 Cinfães
 Sobrado
 Lusitânia de Lourosa
 Pedras Rubras
 Cesarense
 Lusitano de Vildemoinhos
 Anadia
 Sanjoanense
 Estarreja
 Gafanha
 Camacha
 Benfica e Castelo Branco
 AD Nogueirense
 Oliveira do Hospital
 Pampilhosa
 Mortágua
 Tourizense
 Vitória de Sernache
 Naval 1º de Maio
 Caldas
 União de Leiria
 Sertanense
 Alcanenense
 Torreense
 Eléctrico
 Casa Pia
 1.º Dezembro
 Sacavenense
 Loures
 Cova da Piedade
 Pinhalnovense
 Sintrense
 Atlético da Malveira
 Operário
 Louletano
 Angrense
 Moura
 Lusitano VRSA
 Praiense
 Atlético de Reguengos

Promoted from the 2014–15 District Championships:

 Algarve FA: Almancilense
 Aveiro FA: Bustelo
 Beja FA: Castrense
 Braga FA: Torcatense and Arões
 Bragança FA: Argozelo
 Castelo Branco FA: Águias do Moradal
 Coimbra FA: Académica – SF
 Évora FA: Juventude de Évora
 Guarda FA: Sabugal
 Leiria FA: Peniche
 Lisboa FA: Real
 Madeira FA: none (Caniçal declined the promotion)
 Portalegre FA: Crato
 Porto FA: São Martinho and Varzim B
 Santarém FA: Coruchense
 Setúbal FA: Barreirense
 Viana do Castelo FA: Neves
 Vila Real FA: Mondinense
 Viseu FA: Oliveira de Frades
 Azores League: Sporting Ideal

First stage

Serie A

Serie B

Serie C

Serie D

Serie E

Serie F

Serie G

Serie H

Second stage

Promotion groups

North zone

South zone

Promotion play-off

Fafe won 1–0 on aggregate and were promoted.

Final

Relegation groups

Serie A

Serie B

Serie C

Serie D

Serie E

Serie F

Serie G

Serie H

Relegation play-out

First round

Lusitânia da Lourosa lost 3–2 on aggregate and were relegated.

Atlético de Reguengos lost 4–2 on aggregate and were relegated.

Vila Real lost 4–3 on aggregate and were relegated.

Vianense lost 5–2 on aggregate and were relegated.

Second round

1–1 on aggregate. Arões lost 5–4 on penalties and were relegated.

Águias do Moradal lost 3–0 on aggregate and were relegated.

References

Campeonato Nacional de Seniores seasons
3
Por